Zavala was a town in Jasper County, Texas (United States) founded in 1834.  Named for empresario Lorenzo de Zavala, the town was founded on land owned by Thomas Huling and situated along the Angelina River.  The approximately 40 families who lived in the town survived by farming or logging.  The town last appeared on a list of communities in the county in 1878 and has since been abandoned. It is not to be confused with the city of Zavalla, which lies only 20 miles to the northwest, in Angelina County.

History
In 1829 the Mexican government granted empresario Lorenzo de Zavala land in eastern Texas.  The land grant covered an area that is now Jasper County. Thomas Huling purchased some of this land, and in 1834 founded the town of Zavala, named for the empresario, and also known as Muster Point.  The town was incorporated on December 24, 1838 by the Republic of Texas, and a post office was erected in 1839.

In the 1840s, a fire destroyed much of the town, including the courthouse, many homes, and most of the town records. Although the post office was discontinued in 1856, the town remained on a list of Jasper County communities as late as 1878. It has since been abandoned. All that remains of the town is a cemetery which includes a granite marker commemorating the town's previous existence.

Geography
Positioned "on a rise near the east bank of the Angelina river", Zavala lay along the Beef Trail, which ran from Texas into Louisiana. The landscape was very wooded, featuring loblolly pines, shortleaf pines, and oak trees.

Demographics
At its peak, approximately 30–40 families lived in Zavala.  Although Durkee promised to settle immigrants in the area, he was unable to attract enough families to enable the community to survive.

Economy
Many of the town's residents were farmers.  Others worked in logging.  Trees would be cut and floated down the Angelina River to the Neches River, with Beaumont as their final destination.  At one point in the town's history, a railroad line either went through or came very near the town.

Footnotes

References
 

Ghost towns in East Texas
Geography of Jasper County, Texas